Livens may refer to:
George Henry Livens (1886–1950), British mathematician
William Howard Livens (1889-1964), British soldier and inventor of chemical and flame weaponry
Livens Projector, a mortar-like weapon used for gas warfare in World War I
Livens Large Gallery Flame Projector, a flamethrower used in World War I
Jānis Līvens (1884-?), Latvian cyclist who competed in the 1912 Summer Olympics